Ernst-Hoferichter-Preis is a literary prize of Germany. It was established in 1975 and is awarded to writers and artists from Munich. Winners are awarded €5,000.

References

German literary awards
1975 establishments in West Germany
awards established in 1975